A bronze sculpture of Elizabeth Cady Stanton was installed in Johnstown's Sir William Johnson Park, in the U.S. state of New York, in 2021.

See also
 
Portrait Monument, 1920 sculpture, U.S. Capitol rotunda, Washington, D.C.
 Women's Rights Pioneers Monument, 2020 statue in New York City
 List of monuments and memorials to women's suffrage

References

2021 establishments in New York (state)
2021 sculptures
Bronze sculptures in New York (state)
Elizabeth Cady Stanton
Monuments and memorials in New York (state)
Outdoor sculptures in New York (state)
Sculptures of women in New York (state)
Statues in New York (state)